Todd Londot (born April 4, 1983) is a former professional American and Canadian football offensive lineman. He was signed by the New York Giants as an undrafted free agent in 2005. He played college football at Miami (Ohio).

Was a Manager of The Links at Echo Springs an 18-hole public golf course located in Johnstown, OH.

Currently Vice-President of SOARR and owner of Crispin Iron & Metal Company, LLC

Londot was also a member of the Hamilton Tiger-Cats.

External links
Hamilton Tiger-Cats bio
Miami RedHawks bio
New York Giants bio

1983 births
Living people
American football centers
American football offensive guards
American football offensive tackles
Miami RedHawks football players
New York Giants players
Hamilton Tiger-Cats players
People from Utica, Ohio